Alma Theresia Pihl-Klee (15 November 1888 in Moscow – 15 July 1976 in Helsinki) was one of the two female designers at Fabergé and one of the best known female Fabergé workmasters.

She was the daughter of Finnish goldsmith  (1860–1897), granddaughter of Fabergé head jeweler August Holmström and the niece of Fabergé jewelry designer Hilma Alina Holmström (1875–1936) and sister of jeweler and goldsmith Oskar Woldemar Pihl. As a self-trained designer, she started to work for Fabergé in 1909.

She designed the famous Winter Easter Egg in 1913 and Mosaic Easter Egg in 1914, which now belongs to the collection of Queen Elizabeth II of Great Britain, and also many pieces of fine jewelry of which the most famous is a collection of snowflake jewelry designed for Emanuel Nobel.

Pihl moved to Finland due to the Russian Revolution (1917–1923).

References

Literature
 Bainbridge, H. C.: Peter Carl Fabergé: Goldsmith and Jeweller to the Russian Imperial Court. 1966.
 Hill, Gerard & Smorodinova G. G. & Ulyanova, B. L.: Fabergé and the Russian master Goldsmiths. 2008.
 Paro, Maj-Britt: Tant Almas hemlighet: Fabergékonstnären Alma Pihl. [Aunt Alma's Secret. Fabergé Artist Alma Pihl./ Biography in Swedish.] Helsingfors: Tore och Herdis Modeens stiftelse, 2012. 
 Seppälä, Anu: Jääkukkia keisarinnalle: Alma Pihlin uskomaton elämä. [Ice Flowers for the Empress. The Unbelievable Life of Alma Pihl. / Biography in Finnish.] Helsinki: Ajatus Kirjat, 2003. 
 Tillander-Godenhielm, Ulla: Fabergén suomalaiset mestarit [Fabergé's Finnish masters]. Helsinki: Tammi, 2011.   (Lay summary in English.)

External links
 by the V and A

Fabergé workmasters
1888 births
1976 deaths
Artists from Moscow
Artists from the Russian Empire
Finnish people from the Russian Empire
White Russian emigrants to Finland